Thomas Frederick Davies Sr. (August 31, 1831 – November 9, 1905) was the third Bishop of Michigan in the Episcopal Church in the United States.

Personal
Davies was born in Fairfield, Connecticut, on August 31, 1831, to Thomas Frederick and Julia Sanford Davies. He was of Welsh descent and raised in Fairfield. Davies prepared for college at Hopkins Grammar School in New Haven, Connecticut. He entered Yale University in 1849, where he was close friends with George Shiras Jr. and Andrew Dickson White, and graduated in 1853. He studied at Berkeley Divinity School under Bishop John Williams. Davies lived with Bishop Williams for six years, became his secretary, and remained close friends until the death of Bishop Williams. In 1871, he received a Doctor of Divinity from the University of Pennsylvania; a Legum Doctor from Hobart College in 1889; and a Legum Doctor from Yale University in 1893. Davies married Mary L. Hackstaff on April 29, 1862.

He died of pneumonia at his home in Detroit on November 9, 1905, and was buried at Elmwood Cemetery on November 13. He was survived by his wife and his children, Anna Hackstaff, Marion Sanford, and Thomas Frederick Davies Jr. - who was serving as rector of All Saints' Episcopal Church in Worcester, Massachusetts, and would go on to become the second bishop of the Episcopal Diocese of Western Massachusetts.

Professional
Davies was ordained a deacon on May 18, 1856, by Bishop Williams at the Christ Church in Middletown, Connecticut, and priest on May 27, 1857. He was professor in Hebrew at the Berkeley Divinity School from 1857 to 1863.

He served as rector at St. John's Episcopal Church in Portsmouth, New Hampshire, from 1863 to 1868, before becoming rector of St. Peter's Episcopal Church in Philadelphia, Pennsylvania, until 1889.

He was consecrated at St. Peter's as bishop of the Episcopal Diocese of Michigan on St. Luke's Day, October 18, 1889, and served in that position until his death.

References

1831 births
1905 deaths
Clergy from Detroit
People from Fairfield, Connecticut
Yale Divinity School alumni
Hobart and William Smith Colleges alumni
University of Pennsylvania alumni
19th-century American Episcopalians
Episcopal bishops of Michigan
Burials at Elmwood Cemetery (Detroit)